The Museo Civico di Storia Naturale di Milano (Milan Natural History Museum) is a museum in Milan, Italy. It was founded in 1838 when
naturalist Giuseppe de Cristoforis  donated his collections to the city.   Its first director was Giorgio Jan.

The  Museum is located within a 19th-century building in the Indro Montanelli Garden, near the historic city gate of Porta Venezia. The structure was built between 1888 and 1893 in Neo-Romanesque style with Gothic elements.

The museum is divided into five different permanent sections: Mineralogy (with a large collection of minerals from all over the world); Paleontology (with several fossils of dinosaurs and other prehistoric organisms); Natural History of Man (dedicated to the origins and evolution of humans with a particular attention to the relationship of the latter with the environment); Invertebrate Zoology (dedicated to mollusks, arthropods and entomology); and Vertebrate Zoology (dedicated to vertebrates, both exotic and European).

The museum also exhibits the largest Italian collection of full size dioramas (over 100) that allow visitors to observe some peculiar aspects of various ecosystems.

Mineralogy section

The mineralogy section showcases several minerals from all over the world including the world's largest sulfur crystal (from the province of Pesaro-Urbino) and an 8,000 carat Brazilian topaz crystal. Also displayed are examples of londonite, quarz, phosgenite, fluorite, malachite and other minerals.

Paleontology section
This section explains the basics of paleozoology and paleobotany. Displays include fossils of several plants and animals. Among the most valuable pieces are a Spinosaurus snout, the skeletons of two pygmy elephants (Palaeoloxodon falconeri) from Sicily and the only existing fossil of the coelurosaurian theropod Scipionix samniticus. The museum also houses several other casts of dinosaur skeletons such as Allosaurus, Stegosaurus, Dromaeosaurus, Plateosaurus, and Stan (dinosaur), the fifth most complete Tyrannosaurus ever found.

Natural history of man section

This section is dedicated to the origins of humans from early primates to Homo sapiens. Human evolution is described from the phylogenetic, morphological and ecological points of view with several archaeological objects and realistic plastic models. One of the most valuable pieces is the cast of an Australopithecus afarensis skeleton.

Invertebrate Zoology section
This section is divided in two exhibitions. The first is about mollusks and arthropods: displays include a giant clam, which is the largest living bivalve, two Japanese spider crabs (male and female), Scolopendra gigantea, and arachnids like many spiders and scorpions from all over the world. The second exhibition is dedicated to entomology and displays many insects.

Vertebrate Zoology section
On the second floor of the building is the vertebrate zoology section: this section displays many taxidermied animals from both Europe and abroad, and many animal skeletons including that of a sperm whale that measures approximately twelve metres in length. There are also many full-scale dioramas with mounted specimens displayed in realistic settings.

The collection is notable for about 30 primary types of reptiles, many of which have been described by the museum's first director, Giorgio Jan, who is also one of the most prolific herpetologists of all time with about 100 reptile species described.

Directors of the museum
1838–1866 Giorgio Jan
1866–1882 Emilio Cornalia
1882–1891 Antonio Stoppani
1892–1911 
1911–1927 
1928–1951 Bruno Parisi
1951–1964 Edgardo Moltoni
1964–1981 Cesare Conci
1981–1994 Giovanni Pinna
1994–2001 
2001–2010 Enrico Banfi
2010–2012 
since 2012 Domenico Piraina

Gallery

See also
Giuseppe De Cristoforis
List of museums in Milan
List of natural history museums in the World

References

External links
 Official website of the museum 

Natural history museums in Italy
Fossil museums
Anthropology museums
Museums in Milan
Paleontology in Italy
1838 establishments in the Austrian Empire
Museums established in 1838
Tourist attractions in Milan